The Order of St Christopher and Nevis is an Order of Merit of St. Christopher and Nevis. Instituted in 2005, it is awarded to visiting heads of state and other representatives of nations which have made substantial contributions to St Christopher and Nevis. It entitles the bearer to carry the post-nominals SCN.

Recipients
 Tsai Ing-wen, President of Taiwan (ROC) Republic of China

References

Orders, decorations, and medals of Saint Kitts and Nevis
2005 establishments in Saint Kitts and Nevis
Awards established in 2005